Post Oak is an unincorporated community in Benton County, Tennessee, United States.

Notes

Unincorporated communities in Benton County, Tennessee
Unincorporated communities in Tennessee